Thripperumthura is a village in Alappuzha district in the Indian state of Kerala.

Demographics
 India census, Thripperumthura had a population of 15870 with 7523 males and 8347 females.

References

Villages in Alappuzha district